The lynching of George Hughes, which led to what is called the Sherman Riot, took place in Sherman, Texas, in 1930. An African-American man accused of rape and who was tried in court died on May 9 when the Grayson County Courthouse was set on fire by a White mob, who subsequently burned and looted local Black-owned businesses. Martial law was declared on May 10, but by that time many of Sherman's Black-owned businesses had been burnt to the ground. Thirty-nine people were arrested, eight of whom were charged, and later, a grand jury indicted 14 men, none for lynching. By October 1931, two men had been sent to prison for two two-year sentences, one year for arson and one for inciting a riot. The outbreak of violence was followed by two more lynchings in Texas, one in Oklahoma, and several lynching attempts.

Background
Widespread economic difficulty caused by the Great Depression, and the harsh treatment of White planters toward Black sharecroppers, led to racist violence in Texas, and especially in Sherman, Texas, the county seat and economic and administrative center of Grayson County. When George Hughes, a Black man, was accused of having raped a White woman at gunpoint, the fear of miscegenation and racist sensationalism led to a lynching and a violent riot at the courthouse, and then in the city's Black neighborhood. Hughes allegedly assaulted the wife of his employer at their farm, five miles southeast of Sherman, and shot at deputies after being tracked down by a deputy sheriff. He surrendered and was taken to the county jail.

A confession was quickly obtained, and George Hughes was indicted for criminal assault on Monday, May 5. A speedy trial was set for Friday, May 9. In the days preceding the trial, rumors spread about the case, among them that Hughes had allegedly mutilated the (unidentified) woman, who was supposed to be dyingthese rumors were proven false, but Hughes was taken from the jail and housed elsewhere to prevent a lynching. While some were shown the inside of the jail to prove Hughes was not there, a mob still gathered outside every night, refusing to believe the truth.

The trial, the lynching, the looting
Hughes was led to the county courthouse on May 9 by Texas Ranger Captain Frank Hamer (pronounced ) and two other rangers, along with a police sergeant, while the county sheriff and his deputies guarded the courtroom and the hallways leading to it. A large crowd had gathered outside and began filling the corridors; officers cleared part of the courthouse during jury selection and the start of the trial. Soon, still in the morning, the crowd began to throw rocks at the courthouse, with one man waving an American flag and inciting the crowd. A jury was sworn in at noon, and Hughes pleaded guilty to the indictment. While the first witness was testifying, the crowd broke through the doors of the corridor leading to the courtroom, and Texas Rangers fired warning shots, after which the jury was sent away, and while the Rangers fired tear gas, Hughes was led to the vault of the courthouse. People in the courtroom were evacuated with ladders, but the district judge could not decide on a change of venue; Hamer said he thought the trial would end violently if it was held in Sherman.

Two youths set the building on fire by throwing gasoline into an office, around 2:30 pm; it quickly spread and the officials were evacuated with ladders. Hughes, it was reported, asked the deputies that guarded him to leave him in the vault ("a huge two-story vault of steel and concrete"); he could not be rescued by Rangers because of the fire, and outside, the mob cut the water hoses and prevented the firemen from acting. The mob drove a small militia away to get to the fireproof vault, which was, by 4 pm, the only thing left standing, besides the walls of the courthouse. Governor Dan Moody had sent the National Guard, but the mob engaged in a "pitched battle" with them around 6:30 pm; a rumor had spread that Hamer was ordered not to shoot, and the Guard was pushed back. By midnight, members of the mob, using dynamite and acetylene torches, had opened the jail. Hughes was dead, and the mob pulled his body from the vault and, behind a car, they dragged him to the Black business section of Sherman, where they hung him from a tree in front of a drugstore, and lit a fire under him, using material looted from the store. The crowd numbered over 5,000.

The mob then started burning other businesses besides the drugstore, all the while preventing firemen from doing their job. A White man saved a block of Black-owned buildings by claiming they were his; a number of Black citizens defended their property, including a local doctor armed with no more than a shotgun. The following morning, May 10, the majority of the Black-owned businesses in Sherman (including the office of Civil Rights lawyer William J. Durham), and one residential building, had been burned. The militia returned and cut down Hughes's body, but the town's two Black undertakers' businesses had been burned. A White undertaker buried Hughes's body that same morning, in an unmarked grave at the county farm.

Aftermath
Black citizens of Sherman had fled the town, seeking shelter in the brush, in sewers, or among sympathetic White people. When they returned, they found that Black properties destroyed included a hotel, a movie house, a restaurant, and a barbershop, besides the drugstore and the two undertaker parlors. They were a total loss, and the small print on insurance policies stated that no damage that resulted from a riot would be compensated: "it marked the end of Black business in Sherman", according to Edward Hake Phillips, a local historian.

The town was under armed guard for a few more weeks, and while some Whites tried to help their Black fellow citizens, others threatened employers if they did not fire their Black employees, and put up notices telling Black people to get out of town or see their homes destroyed.

Legal consequences for the mob
On the morning of May 10, 225 extra National Guard members arrived in Sherman, and two extra Rangers. Eleven men were arrested but six were soon released. Governor Moody finally declared martial law that evening, after local community leaders urged him to do so, and more arrests were made. A military court of inquiry was installed, and orders were given to shoot whoever attempted to burn or destroy Black-owned properties. By May 13, thirty-nine arrests had been made. A justice of the peace charged nine of them, but immediately dismissed a number of them. Troops remained stationed at the Black school, which reopened on May 14, though some Guardsmen were sent home.

On May 21, 1930, a Sherman grand jury – reporting to Grayson County District Judge Roger Mills Carter, Sr. (1887–1954) – returned ninety-six indictments against thirty-two defendants, which eventually shrank to seventy indictments against fourteen mob members. Maury Hughes (1894–1955) and Ted Monroe ( Theodore Fuller Monroe; 1890–1952), both of Dallas, were retained to represent 13 of the indicted men. Hughes had been a member of the Dallas Ku Klux Klan, but resigned and became an opponent of the Klan.

In the end, only one man was convicted. J.B. "Screw" McCasland ( J.B. McCasland; 1912–1997) – on a change of venue, tried in Austin – was convicted June 4, 1931, for arson and July 1, 1931, for participating in a riot. He was sentenced to the penitentiary, two years for each conviction. No one was charged for the lynching.

Martial law was lifted on May 24, 1930. The Herald Democrat printed an editorial criticizing the riots and property damage, but not the lynching. Before the lynching and riot, McCasland had been sentenced to three years for two chicken theft charges and also sentenced for another burglary charge – he was serving a total of thirteen years. Governor Miriam A. Ferguson, on December 28, 1934, granted McCasland a conditional pardon, in part, because of the illness of his mother, Mae McCasland ( Hanna Mae Waddle; 1892–1982), who, in 1928, became a widow.

Although McCasland's conviction was for arson and rioting, not lynching, Joe Cox ( Joseph Price Cox; 1885–1970), District Attorney at Sherman who assisted in the prosecution, said that McCasland's conviction was the first in Texas growing out of mob violence against a Black man for [allegedly] attacking a White woman.

Community resistance to memorialize the lynching and riot 

There is, however, a Texas Historical Commission historical marker on the courthouse lawn, erected in 2001, bearing about 257 words in bas-relief cast aluminum, commemorating the courthouses of Grayson County. It merely mentions the fire, to wit: [the courthouse] "served the county until it burned in 1930". The marker is one of several on the lawn and is only a few feet away from a Confederate monument that was erected in 1897. A proprosal submitted in 2020 to erect a marker (commemorating the lynching and riot) was approved by the manager of the historical marker program, but was blocked in December 2020 by Bill Magers, the Grayson County Commissioners Court Judge.

Reflections by historians 
Hollie A. Teague, in 2018, published a treatise criticizing Texas law enforcement's long history of (paraphrasing) "brutality and wanton dereliction of duty" towards Blacks. In the article, Teague summarized the lynching of George Hughes as follows: " by Pearl Farlow, the niece of a powerful law enforcement officer in Sherman  resulted in a power display that included the death of the accused man, the total destruction of Sherman’s Black business district, the obliteration of a large courthouse, mobilization of the National Guard, and the eventual declaration of martial law. All the while, law enforcement – including the notoriously brutal Texas Ranger Frank Hamer – stood by and did nothing."

By contrast, John Boessenecker, in 2016, lauded Texas Ranger Hamer as follows: "It was clear that he [Hamer] displayed great courage defending George Hughes, for in a time and place where racial hatred ran rampant, Hamer stood unbowed before the mob. On the other hand, his failure to act while the mob destroyed the Black neighborhood was no more defensible than Sherman police directing traffic while the lynchers blew open the vault."

Texas historian Melissa Thiel, a proponent of memorializing the lynching and riot, stated, "There are eight Texas historic markers at that courthouse – several  [for] events [that] didn't even happen at the courthouse, but this did." "Our courthouse burned down."

Graham Gordon Landrum, PhD (1922–1995), in 1960, wrote, "Some people are still sensitive about it. The names of persons who were indicted in the weeks that followed the violence, for example, have been carefully excised from the newspaper files in the public library."

Other lynchings of Black men in Texas during the following few weeks 

The lynching of George Hughes was one of five lynching attacks by Whites on Black men within nine weeks in Texas.
<li> May 16, 1930: George Johnson (1900–1930), a Black man accused of slaying his White landlord, George Forrest Fortenberry (1879–1930), after an altercation over a debt, was shot to death by a sheriff's posse after he had barricaded himself in a cabin in Honey Grove, Fannin County, Texas. White men then fastened the body's feet to the back of a truck, face down. In this position the corpse was dragged five miles through the business section of town, then into the then-called "Negro section of Honey Grove," then they publicly burned his remains. Honey Grove is 50 miles east of Sherman – Fannin County is the next county over from Grayson County.

<li> June 18, 1930: Bill Roan ( William Roan), a Black man, worked for Mr. and Mrs. Henry Bowman on their farm near Benchley. June 15, 1930 – a Sunday – Henry Bowman ( Henry Monroe Bowman; 1888–1972) beat Roan for being "sassy" with his wife. Bowman allegedly took Roan to his barn, stripped him, and brutally whipped him with a wet rope. The next day, Monday, Bowman's wife, Helen Bowman ( Ruby Helen Peyton; 1898–1979), accused Roan of attempting to assault her. Local law enforcement officers, including Brazos County Deputy Sheriff C.L. Baker ( Charles Lorin Baker; 1869–1935), were apprised of the accusations, they did little to investigate. Wednesday morning, June 18, 1930, Roan was found dead by two White men, Columbus Seale and John O'Connor ( John Albert O'Connor; 1897–1960), in a pasture of a cattle ranch in Brazos County owned by Columbus's father, Robert Henry Seale (1860–1943). One of Roan's arms was "almost torn off by buckshot" and he had "a gaping wound in his chest."  Roan was slain, reportedly, by a posse of a dozen White men who hunted him down. Deputy Sheriff Baker, on Tuesday, June 17, 1930, had been informed by a member of a posse of about a dozen White men that they were going to hunt for and kill Roan. Baker simply told them to "go home." After Roan's body was found, Brazos and Robertson County authorities, including Deputy Sheriff Baker, reportedly claimed to not know any members of the posse.
<li> June 28, 1930: Jack Robertson, a Black man accused of shooting R.L. Egger ( Robert Lee Egger; 1896–1973), blinding him, and also accused of shooting his wife, Stella Egger ( Stella Marie Baker; 1899–1993) – both white, Mr. Egger, a dairyman said to be Robertson's employer, reportedly the result of an argument over chickens, was lynched (fatally shot) at night in Round Rock, Texas, by a posse.
<li> July 12, 1930, Shamrock, Texas, a posse headed by Collingsworth County Sheriff Claude Elihu McKinney (1885–1972) thwarted a mob of 200 White men attempting to lynch Jesse Lee Washington (1909–1930), a Black farmhand accused of attacking and killing a White farm woman, Ruth Vaughan ( Mabel Ruth Tackitt; 1905–1930), wife of Henry Hugh Vaughan (1906–1932). Washington was convicted of murder and sentenced to death, which was carried out by electric chair July 12, 1930, in Huntsville.
Henry Vaughan committed suicide by Cyanide poisoning, September 12, 1932, in San Antonio.

Nearby lynching in Oklahoma 
<li> May 30, 1930: Henry Argo, a Black man, was lynched in Chickasha, Oklahoma – the birthplace of civil rights activist Ada Lois Sipuel Fisher (1924–1995), about 165 miles north-northwest of Sherman. Argo was accused of attacking Mrs. Angie Skinner ( Clara Angeline Orlds; 1910–1968), a White woman, at her dugout home, about a mile from Chickasha. Argo was in the Grady County jail while awaiting trial when, on May 31, 1930, a member of a White mob stormed the jail and fought National Guardsmen. Another unidentified member of the mob managed to shoot through the jail window, critically injuring Argo with a bullet through his skull. The shooter was said to have been Jud Brown. While Argo was laying wounded on a cot in the jail, G.W. Skinner ( George Washington Skinner; 1899–1960), husband of the accuser, plunged a knife into Argo's chest. Authorities took Argo to a nearby hospital where, reportedly, medical attendants refused aid. Argo, then unconscious and thought by the mob to be dead, was returned to the jail.  He then was transferred to the University of Oklahoma Hospital in Oklahoma City, where he died May 31, 1930; 12:40 .

On May 21, 2021, Rev. Dr. Raushan Paul Ashanti-Alexander proposed that the City of Chickasha pass a resolution condemning the actions that led to Argo's death. Mayor Chris Mosley agreed to prepare the resolution.

See also 
 List of lynching victims in the United States

Bibliography

Annotations

Notes

News media 

  ; .

 
 .
 Davies, David ( Albert Ernest Davies III; born 1953) (host / interviewer); 

 

 
  ; .

 
 
 

 
  ; .
 
 
 

   (publication);  (U.S. Newsstream database) (article).
  ; ; .

Books, journals, magazines, and papers 

   ;  (e-book); .

 .
  .

 

   (publication);  (article).

  .

  .

   (2nd ed.; 1967); .

  .

  
 
  .

   (1933),  (1969);  (1969),  (1960), .

 

 
   (online), .

 
 
 
 

Government and genealogical archives

Other resources 

 

 
 

 Kumler, Donna (interviewer) ( Donna Jean Capps; born 1950);  .
  .
  .

  ; ; .

  ; ; .

 
 Interviewees:
<li> 
<li> 
<li> 
<li> 
<li> 
<li> 
<li>

External links 
 
 
  website
 

1930 deaths
1930 murders in the United States
Lynching victims in the United States
Lynching deaths in Texas
Murdered African-American people
People murdered in Texas
Deaths from fire in the United States
Prisoners murdered in custody

1930 in Texas
May 1930 events
Crimes in Texas
Arson in Texas

Racially motivated violence against African Americans
White American riots in the United States
Riots and civil disorder in Texas

African-American history between emancipation and the civil rights movement
Anti-black racism in the United States
African-American history of Texas
History of racism in Texas

Grayson County, Texas
People from Sherman, Texas
Race-related controversies in the United States
People or corpses dragged behind a vehicle